Terry Walsh (born 21 June 1927) is a former  Australian rules footballer who played with North Melbourne in the Victorian Football League (VFL).

Notes

External links 

Living people
1927 births
Australian rules footballers from New South Wales
North Melbourne Football Club players
Finley Football Club players